Thốt Nốt is the main urban district of the city of Cần Thơ in the Mekong Delta region of Vietnam. To the south and west it borders Vĩnh Thạnh district and An Giang province, and to the north with Đồng Tháp province. As of 2003 the district had a population of 192,327. By 2007 this had risen to 196,610. The district covers an area of 171 km². The district capital lies at Thốt Nốt.

Administrative divisions
The district is divided into 9 wards:

Thới Thuận, Thuận An, Thốt Nốt, Thạnh Hòa, Trung Nhứt, Trung Kiên, Thuận Hưng, Tân Hưng and Tân Lộc.

Economy
Currently an industrial zone is being built in Thốt Nốt with a total area of 22.5 hectares. This area is oriented as a third industrial city of Cần Thơ, the Trà Nóc Industrial Zone, and Hưng Phú.

References

Districts of Cần Thơ